The 2012 New Haven Open at Yale (New Haven Open at Yale presented by First Niagara for sponsorship reasons) was a women's tennis tournament played on outdoor hard courts. It was the 44th edition of the New Haven Open at Yale, and was part of the Premier Series of the 2012 WTA Tour. It took place at the Cullman-Heyman Tennis Center in New Haven, Connecticut, United States, from August 17 through August 25, 2012. It was the last event on the 2012 US Open Series before the 2012 US Open.

Singles main-draw entrants

Seeds

 Seedings are based on the rankings of August 13, 2012

Other entrants
The following players received wildcards into the singles main draw:
  Petra Kvitová 
  Bethanie Mattek-Sands
  Laura Robson

The following players received entry from the qualifying draw:
  Tímea Babos 
  Nicole Gibbs 
  Alexa Glatch
  Olga Govortsova

The following players entry as lucky loser:
  Vera Dushevina 
  Melanie Oudin

Withdrawals
The following players withdrew from the singles main draw:
  Kaia Kanepi (achilles tendon injury)
  Christina McHale (gastrointestinal illness) 
  Anastasia Pavlyuchenkova
  Flavia Pennetta (wrist injury)
  Francesca Schiavone (gastrointestinal illness)

Retirements
  Mona Barthel (gastrointestinal illness)
  Varvara Lepchenko (wrist injury)
  Agnieszka Radwańska (right shoulder injury)
  Caroline Wozniacki (right knee injury)

Doubles main-draw entrants

Seeds

1 Rankings are as of August 13, 2012

Other entrants
The following pair received wildcard into the doubles main draw:
  Tímea Babos /  Sloane Stephens
The following pair received entry as alternates:
  Sílvia Soler Espinosa /  Carla Suárez Navarro

Withdrawals
  Paola Suárez (low back injury)

Finals

Singles

 Petra Kvitová defeated  Maria Kirilenko, 7–6(11–9), 7–5

Doubles

 Liezel Huber /  Lisa Raymond defeated  Andrea Hlaváčková /  Lucie Hradecká, 4–6, 6–0, [10–4]

References

External links
Official website

 
2012 WTA Tour